This is the production discography of hip-hop producer Rockwilder. Rockwilder first began producing through an affiliation with rapper Redman and fellow producer Erick Sermon.  His first career productions came in the year 1994, when he produced many songs on the Flatlinerz' debut album U.S.A., and also for Redman and Organized Konfusion.  His profile rose greatly after he produced Method Man & Redman's "Da Rockwilder" and Jay-Z's hit "Do It Again (Put Ya Hands Up)."  In the early decade, he would make contributions to many high-profile artist's albums. He notably produced several songs and remixes for Janet Jackson's All for You, bringing his productions into mainstream pop.

1994

Flatlinerz - U.S.A.
04. "Flatline"
05. "Sonic Boom"
06. "Brooklyn/Queens"
07. "718"
10. "Whydyadoit"
11. "Takin' Em Underground"
12. "Graveyard Nightmare"
14. "Rivaz of Red"

Organized Konfusion - Stress: The Extinction Agenda
13. "Maintain"

Redman - Dare Iz a Darkside
02. "Bobyahed2dis"
06. "Noorotic"

1995

Erick Sermon - Double or Nothing
07. "Boy Meets World"
08. "Welcome"

Jamal - Last Chance, No Breaks
03. "Situation" (co-produced by Erick Sermon)
05. "Fades ’Em All" (co-produced by Redman)
10. "Genetic For Terror" feat. L.O.D., Keith Murray & 50 Grand (co-produced by Redman)

1996

Various Artists - Insomnia
05. Jamal & Calif - Beez Like That (Sometimes)

Redman - Muddy Waters
05. "Case Closed"
19. "What U Lookin' 4"

1997

Busta Rhymes - When Disaster Strikes
15. "One"

Organized Konfusion - The Equinox
18. "Somehow, Someway"

1998

All City - Metropolis Gold
02. "Stay Awake"
11. "Get Paid"
16. "Move on You (Remix)"

Big Punisher - Capital Punishment
03. "Super Lyrical"
20. "You Came Up"

Jay-Z - “Vol. 2... Hard Knock Life” 
11. “Reservoir Dogs” (Co- produced with Erick Sermon & Darold “POP” Trotter)

Busta Rhymes - E.L.E. (Extinction Level Event): The Final World Front
08. "Do It to Death"

Redman - Doc's Da Name 2000
03. "I'll Bee Dat"

1999

Jay-Z - Vol. 3... Life and Times of S. Carter
03. "Do It Again (Put Ya Hands Up)"
14. "NYMP"

Method Man & Redman - Blackout!
07. "Da Rockwilder"

Tash - Rap Life
13. "Fallin' On"
14. "Tash Rules"

2000

Amil - All Money Is Legal
04. "Ya'll Dead Wrong"
07. "Girlfriend"

Beanie Sigel - The Truth
08. "Stop, Chill"

Busta Rhymes - Anarchy
18. "Make Noise"

D.I.T.C. - D.I.T.C.
13. "Thick (Rockwilder mix)"

De La Soul - Art Official Intelligence: Mosaic Thump
06. "I.C. Y'All"

DJ Clue - The Professional 2
07. "Getting It"

Jay-Z - The Dynasty: Roc La Familia
09. "Guilty Until Proven Innocent"

Lil' Kim - The Notorious K.I.M.
08. "Notorious K.I.M."

LL Cool J - G.O.A.T.
02. "Imagine That"

Various Artists - Lyricist Lounge Vol. 2
02. "Oh No" (Mos Def featuring Pharoahe Monch and Nate Dogg)

Prodigy - H.N.I.C.
16. "Do It"
20. "Gun Play"

Rah Digga - Dirty Harriet
10. "Break Fool"

The Dwellas - The Last Shall Be First
13. "Ill Collabo"

Xzibit - Restless
02. "Front 2 Back"

2001

Angie Martinez - Up Close and Personal
15. "Mi Amor"

Erick Sermon - Music
02. "It's Nuttin'"

Fabolous - Ghetto Fabolous
04. "Get Right"

Fat Joe - Jealous Ones Still Envy
15. "Murder Rap"

Janet Jackson - All for You
02. "You Ain't Right"
05. "Come on Get Up"
09. "Would You Mind"
11. "Trust a Try"
17. "Feels So Right"
18. "Doesn't Really Matter" (Incorporates part of Rockwilder Remix)
21. "Who"

Janet Jackson - Doesn't Really Matter (Remixes)
 "Doesn't Really Matter" (Rockwilder Mix/Dance All Day Extended Mix)
 "Doesn't Really Matter" (Rockwilder Radio Edit)
 "Doesn't Really Matter" (Rockwilder Instrumental)
 "Doesn't Really Matter" (Rockwilder Radio Instrumental)

Janet Jackson - All for You (Remixes)
 "All for You" (Rockwilder Main Mix)
 "All for You" (Rockwilder Radio Mix)
 "All for You" (Rockwilder Main Instrumental)

Janet Jackson - Son of a Gun (Remixes)
 "Son of a Gun (I Betcha Think this Song is About You) (feat. Missy Elliott) (Rock Remix)

Left Eye - Supernova
02. "Hot!"

Mary J. Blige - No More Drama
07. "Keep It Moving"

Mystikal - Tarantula
06. "Ooooh Yeah"
10. "I Get It Started"

Outsidaz - The Bricks
02. "Keep On"

Ras Kass - Van Gogh
10. "NBA"

Redman - Malpractice
04. "Let's Get Dirty (I Can't Get in da Club)"
15. "What I'ma Do Now"

Sticky Fingaz - Blacktrash: The Autobiography of Kirk Jones
06. "Money Talks"
12. "Cheatin'"

Tha Alkaholiks - X.O. Experience
03. "Run Wild"
11. "Sickness"

2002

Christina Aguilera - Stripped
16. "Dirrty" (featuring Redman)

Kool G Rap - The Giancana Story
07. "Blaze Wit Ya'll"

Various Artists - Soundbombing III
03. "Freak Daddy" (Mos Def)

Nas - The Lost Tapes
07. "Everybody's Crazy"

Whuteva - Friday After Next
07. "Mardi Gras"

Styles P - A Gangster and a Gentleman
06. "Daddy Get That Cash"

Xzibit - Man Vs. Machine
01. "Release Date"
19. “(Hit U) Where It Hurts”

2003

50 Cent - Get Rich or Die Tryin'
12. "Like My Style"

Craig G - This Is Now
06. "Stomped"

DJ Envy - The Desert Storm Mixtape: Blok Party, Vol. 1
10. "Throw Your Shit Up"

DMX - Grand Champ
14. "Rob All Night (If I'm Gonna Rob)"

Keith Murray - He's Keith Murray
13. "Swagger Back"

Kelis - Tasty
05. "In Public"

2004

Cassidy - Split Personality
14. "I'm Hungry"

Destiny's Child - Destiny Fulfilled
08. "If"
09. "Free"

Drag-On - Hell and Back
09. "Let's Get Crazy"

Method Man - Tical 0: The Prequel
14. "Act Right"

2005

Funkmaster Flex - Funkmaster Flex Car Show Tour
16. "6 Minutes"

Nate Dogg - Nate Dogg
02. "Bad Girls"
04. "Keep It Real"
05. "Leave Her Alone"
07. "Round and Round"
12. "I Got Game"

Sheek Louch - After Taxes
04. "Pain"
06. "One Name"

Streetlife - Street Education
04. "Street Education"

2006

Prince Po - Prettyblack
08. "Breaknight"

Ray Cash - Cash on Delivery
11. "Livin' My Life"
13. "The Bomb"

2007

Beanie Sigel - The Solution
06. "Shake It For Me"

Lil Wayne - The Drought Is Over 2 (The Carter 3 Sessions)
11. "Zoo (Feat. Mack Maine)"

Redman - Red Gone Wild
07. "How U Like Dat"
16. "Hold Dis Blaow!"
18. "Merry Jane"

2008

Kelly Rowland - Ms. Kelly
06. "Every Thought is You"

2009

50 Cent - Before I Self Destruct
14. "Do You Think About Me"

Method Man & Redman - Blackout! 2
06. "Hey Zulu"
17. "A Lil Bit"

2010

Redman - Reggie
08. "Mic, Lights, Camera, Action"

2013

The Capitol D, Level, & Desert Eagle - Bullfight Records: More Than A Mixtape
"Wild"

2015

Tyrese - Black Rose
 03 "Picture Perfect" (produced with Eric Hudson)

2016

Snoop Dogg - Coolaid
"Feel About Snoop"

2017

Busta Rhymes - TBA
"Girlfriend" (featuring Vybz Kartel & Tory Lanez)

2020

Busta Rhymes - Extinction Level Event 2: The Wrath of God
"Czar" (featuring M.O.P.)
"Satanic"

Soundtracks
P.J.'s, (1999), (OST)
Gone in 60 Seconds, (2000), (OST)
Legally Blonde, (2001), (OST)
Rush Hour 2,  (2001), (OST)
Training Day,(2001), (OST)
How High (2001), (OST)
Friday After Next (2002), (OST)
MTV's Hip Hopera: Carmen (2001), (OST)
The Source Presents: Hip Hop Hits, Vol... (2000), (Various Artists)
Def Jam 1985-2001: History of HipHop vol.1 (2001), (Various Artists)
MTV Presents Def Jam:  Let the People Speak (2001), (Various Artists)
Heavy Hits Mixed by DJ Enuff (2001), (Various Artists)

References

Production discographies
Discographies of American artists